Institute of Design (ID) at the Illinois Institute of Technology (Illinois Tech), founded as the New Bauhaus, is a graduate school teaching systemic, human-centered design.

History

The Institute of Design at Illinois Tech is a school of design founded in 1937 in Chicago by László Moholy-Nagy, a Bauhaus teacher (1923–1928).

After a spell in London, Bauhaus master Moholy-Nagy, at the invitation of Chicago's Association of Art and Industry, moved to Chicago in 1937 to start a new design school, which he named the New Bauhaus. The philosophy of the school was basically unchanged from that of the original, and its first headquarters was the Prairie Avenue mansion that architect Richard Morris Hunt, designed for department store magnate Marshall Field.

Due to financial problems the school briefly closed in 1938. However, Walter Paepcke, Chairman of the Container Corporation of America and an early champion of industrial design in America, soon offered his personal support, and in 1939, Moholy-Nagy re-opened the school as the Chicago School of Design. In 1944, this became the Institute of Design, and in 1949 it became part of the new Illinois Institute of Technology university system and also the first institution in the United States to offer a PhD in design.

Moholy authored an account of his efforts to develop the curriculum of the School of Design in his book Vision in Motion.

Archival materials are held by the Ryerson & Burnham Libraries at the Art Institute of Chicago. The Institute of Design Collection includes articles, letters, photographs, and other materials documenting the institute's history and works by faculty and students. Select archival film materials are held at Chicago Film Archives, who store and provide access to a handful of Institute of Design films.

Educational programs
The Institute of Design offers two professional degrees, the Master of Design (MDes) and the Master of Design Methods (MDM), as well as a research degree, the PhD, which was the first doctoral program in design in the United States, a MDes/MPA program, and a dual MDes/MBA degree program, also the first of its kind, with the IIT Stuart School of Business. 

At one time, the Institute of Design offered a Bachelor of Science in Design degree, with specialties in Photography, Product Design and Communication Design. The Bachelor's program was halted in 1998.

Conferences
The Institute of Design annually organizes two large design conferences in the Chicago area: The Strategy Conference for international executives and designers who come together to address how businesses can use design to explore emerging opportunities, and the Design Research Conference, organized by students, exploring emerging trends in design research.

Directors
1937–1945, László Moholy-Nagy
1946–1951, Serge Chermayeff
1951–1955, Crombie Taylor (acting)
1955–1969, Jay Doblin
1969–1974, James S. Montague (acting)
1974–1982, various
1982–1986, Dale Fahnstrom
1986–2017, Patrick Whitney
2017–2022, Denis Weil

Prominent former faculty
George Anselevicius (1949–1952)
Alexander Archipenko
John Cage
Harry Callahan, Photography (1947–1961)
Jay Doblin, Director (1954–1968)
Buckminster Fuller
Michael Higgins, Head of Visual Design
George Fred Keck
György Kepes
Michael McCoy and Katherine McCoy (1995–2003)
Sharon Poggenpohl Professor and coordinator the PhD program (1987-2013)
Ralph Rapson (1942–1946)
Arthur Siegel, Photography (1946–1949 and 1967–1977)
Aaron Siskind, Photography (1951–1971)
Robert Bruce Tague, Architecture
Konrad Wachsmann, Advanced Building Research (Director) (1950-1964) 
Hugo Weber (1949- 1955) 
Massimo Vignelli (1958–1960)

Former names and locations
New Bauhaus - American School of Design
1938: 1905 S. Prairie Avenue, Chicago

The School of Design in Chicago
1939–1945: 247 E. Ontario Street, Chicago

The Institute of Design
1945–1946: 1009 N. State Street, Chicago
1946–1956: 632 N. Dearborn Street, Chicago
1956–1989: S.R. Crown Hall IIT campus on South State Street
1989–1996: 10 West 35th Street (ITRI on IIT campus)
1996–2016: 350 N. LaSalle Blvd, Chicago
2016-2018: 565 W. Adams St, Chicago
2018–Present: Kaplan Institute, 3137 S Federal St., Chicago

Prominent alumni

Robert Brownjohn, artist and graphic designer
Ivan Chermayeff, Principal of Chermayeff & Geismar, son of former Institute of Design director Serge Chermayeff and designer of the Chase Manhattan Bank logo among other achievements
Burton Kramer, graphic designer, artist, A.G.I., Order of Ontario, D.Des (Hon) O.C.A.D.U.
June Leaf, (attended 1947-1948, M.A. Art Education in 1954) painter, sculptor
Estes W. Mann (Armour Institute), Memphis based architect who produced numerous NRHP listed residences
Ray Metzker, photographer
Richard Nickel, photographer and architectural preservationist
Louis Sauer (attended 1949 to 1953), architect
Art Sinsabaugh, (B.A. 1949, M.S. 1967) American photographer; founded and led the photography/cinematography department, University of Illinois, Urbana-Champaign, 1959–83; founding member, Society for Photographic Education
Roger Sweet (MS 1960), Toy inventor and creator of He-Man from Mattel
Madeline Tourtelot, artist, founder of the Peninsula School of Art
John Henry Waddell, sculptor
Claire Zeisler, fiber artist

See also
 Illinois Institute of Technology School of Architecture
 Ludwig Mies van der Rohe
The New Bauhaus, a documentary film about László Moholy-Nagy, directed by Alysa Nahmias (2019).

References

External links
 Institute of Design web site
 Institute of Design's biweekly student newsletter, the New Idiom
 IIT's Galvin Library Institute of Design exhibit 
 Chicago New Bauhaus School Alumnis [sic]

Illinois Institute of Technology
Design schools in the United States
Educational institutions established in 1937
1937 establishments in Illinois